Otto Buck (born 15 November 1876) was an Australian rules footballer who played with Carlton in the Victorian Football League (VFL). He had previously been a member of Carlton's 1896 VFA team.

Family
The son of the watchmaker Francis James Buck (1849-1916), and Ann Elizabeth "Nettie" Buck (1846-1897), née Sparks, Samuel Otto John Buck was born at St Arnaud, Victoria on 15 November 1876.

He married Florence Loveday Hince (1880-1902) in 1897. He married Cecilia Hickey (1882-) in 1904.

Football
He was a member of the Carlton team that played against Fitzroy in the first game of the first VFL season, at the Brunswick Street Oval, on 8 May 1897.

See also
 List of Carlton Football Club players

Notes

References

External links 
 
 
 Otto Buck's profile at Blueseum

1876 births
Australian rules footballers from Victoria (Australia)
Carlton Football Club (VFA) players
Carlton Football Club players
Year of death missing